Dejan Jovanović (born 17 Aприл 1986) is a Serbian football midfielder.

References

External links
 
 Dejan Jovanović stats at utakmica.rs 
 

1986 births
Living people
Sportspeople from Valjevo
Association football midfielders
Serbian footballers
FK Jedinstvo Ub players
FK Donji Srem players
Serbian SuperLiga players